The 1982–83 British Hockey League season was the inaugural season of the British Hockey League.

Fifteen teams from the Northern League, English League North and the English League South took part.

League

The league was divided into three sections of five teams. Teams in section B played every team once at home and once away while teams in section A and C played teams in their own section four times and the teams from section B twice. Teams in section A did not play teams from section C. This meant that while section A and C teams played 26 games, section B teams played 28. Murrayfield, Glasgow, Durham, Crowtree and Richmond all had games voided.

Section A

*Murrayfield two games void, Glasgow one game void

Section B

*One game void

Section C

*One game void

Playoffs

English Semi Final

Section B Runner Up (Cleveland) vs Section A Winner (Altrincham)
Cleveland Bombers 21-10 Altrincham Aces
Altrincham Aces 5-4 Cleveland Bombers (Cleveland win 26–14 on aggregate)

English Final
In the English Final the winner of the semi final took on the winner of Section B in a best of three series. In games one and two, the winning side was awarded one point while the winner of game three was awarded two points. The overall winner qualified for the British final.

Section B Winner (Durham) vs English Semi Final Winner (Cleveland)
Cleveland Bombers 3-10 Durham Wasps
Durham Wasps 11-4 Cleveland Bombers
Durham Wasps 8-2 Cleveland Bombers

Scottish Final

Section A Winner (Dundee) vs Section A Runner Up (Murrayfield)
Dundee Rockets 7-8 Murrayfield Racers
Murrayfield Racers 1-5 Dundee Rockets (Dundee win 12–9 on aggregate)

British Championship Final
The final was between the winner of the English and Scottish finals. It was a one-off game played at Streatham Ice Rink.

Dundee Rockets 6-2 Durham Wasps

References

1982–83 in British ice hockey
United
British Hockey League seasons